San Bernardino station may refer to:

San Bernardino Santa Fe Depot, the rail station opened in 1918
San Bernardino Transit Center, the rail and bus station opened in 2014
San Bernardino Downtown Station, the post office on the list of National Register of Historic Places